Sabaconidae is a family of harvestmen with 57 described species in one genus, Sabacon, which is found throughout the Northern Hemisphere.

Name
The name of the type genus is derived from "Sabacon", an Egyptian king.

Description
This family is very easily recognizable on the basis of the unique pedipalp morphology, which is densely covered in plumose setae, and features a concave depression on the tibia, and a bulbous tarsus, which fits snugly into the tibial depression.

Distribution
Sabaconidae exhibits a wide, yet highly disjunct, distribution. Species can be found throughout North America, Europe, and Asia, though individual species usually have very restricted distributions.

Fossil Record
There is one species, Sabacon bachofeni Roewer, 1939, known from Baltic amber.

Relationships
Sabaconidae belongs to the superfamily Ischyropsalidoidea. The family originally consisted of just the genus *Sabacon*, though *Taracus* was later added to the family. *Hesperonemastoma* was later moved to this family, as well, after molecular studies confirmed that this genus was closely related to *Taracus*. However, a new family, Taracidae, was later erected for *Hesperonemastoma* and *Taracus*, leaving Sabaconidae once again monogeneric. Currently, Sabaconidae is thought to be most closely related to Taracidae, and more distantly to Ischyropsalididae.

The internal relationships of Sabaconidae are not fully understood. Generally, species within a geographical region form a clade, with the exception of *Sabacon cavicolens*, which belongs to a clade with the European species.

Species
There are currently 57 described species, 2 of which are subdivided into 2 subspecies. 
 Sabacon aigoual Martens, 2015
 Sabacon akiyoshiense Suzuki, 1963
 Sabacon altomontanum Martens, 1983 
 Sabacon astoriensis Shear, 1975
 Sabacon beatae Martens, 2015
 Sabacon beishanensis Martens, 2015
 Sabacon briggsi Shear, 1975
 Sabacon bryantii (Banks, 1898) 
 Sabacon cavicolens (Packard, 1884)
 Sabacon chomolongmae Martens, 1972
 Sabacon crassipalpe (L. Koch, 1879)
 Sabacon dentipalpe Suzuki, 1949
 Sabacon dhaulagiri Martens, 1972
 Sabacon distinctus Suzuki, 1974
 Sabacon franzi Roewer, 1953
 Sabacon gonggashan Tsurusaki & Song, 1993
 Sabacon hinkukhola Martens, 2015
 Sabacon imamurai Suzuki, 1964
 Sabacon iriei Suzuki, 1974
 Sabacon ishizuchi Suzuki, 1974
 Sabacon jaegeri Martens, 2015
 Sabacon jiriensis Martens, 1972
 Sabacon kangding Martens, 2015
 Sabacon maipokhari Martens, 2015
 Sabacon makinoi Suzuki, 1949

 Sabacon makinoi makinoi Suzuki, 1949
 Sabacon makinoi sugimotoi Suzuki & Tsurusaki, 1983
 Sabacon martensi Tsurusaki & Song, 1993
 Sabacon minutissimus Martens, 2015
 Sabacon minshanensis Martens, 2015
 Sabacon mitchelli Crosby & Bishop, 1924
 Sabacon monacanthus Martens, 2018
 Sabacon multiserratus Martens, 2015
 Sabacon nishikawai Martens, 2015
 Sabacon occidentalis (Banks, 1894)
 Sabacon okadai Suzuki, 1941
 Sabacon palpogranulatum Martens, 1972
 Sabacon paradoxus Simon, 1879
 Sabacon pasonianus Glez-Luque, 1991
 Sabacon pauperoserratus Martens, 2015
 Sabacon petarberoni Martens, 2015
 Sabacon picosantrum Martens, 1983
 Sabacon pygmaeum Miyosi, 1942
 Sabacon relictoides Martens, 2015
 Sabacon relictum Marten, 1972
 Sabacon rossopacificus Martens, 2015
 Sabacon rupinala Martens, 2015
 Sabacon satoikioi Miyosi, 1942
 Sabacon sergeidedicatus Martens, 1989
 Sabacon shawalleri Martens, 2015
 Sabacon sheari Cokendolpher, 1984
 Sabacon simbuakhola Martens, 2015
 Sabacon simoni Dresco, 1952
 Sabacon sineglandula Martens, 2015
 Sabacon siskiyou Shear, 1975
 Sabacon suzukii Martens, 2018
 Sabacon thakkolanus Martens, 2015
 Sabacon unicornis Martens, 1972
 Sabacon viscayanus Simon, 1881

Sabacon viscayanus ramblaianum Martens, 1983
 Sabacon viscayanus viscayanus Simon, 1881

References

Harvestman families
Monogeneric arthropod families